Nkem (pronounced in-kem) is a slightly female-biased unisex given name found among the Igbo people of Nigeria. It is a short form of either Nkemdilim, Nkemjika, Nkemakolam  or Nkemakonam and means "mine" or "my own." The name may refer to:
Nkem Akaraiwe (born 1996), Nigerian basketball player 
Dora Nkem Akunyili (1954–2014), Nigerian federal minister
Nkem Ezurike (born 1992), Canadian soccer player
Nkem Nwankwo (1936–2001), Nigerian novelist and poet
Nkem Ojougboh (born 1987), Nigerian basketball player
Nkem Okeke, Nigerian economist
Nkem Okotcha (born 1977), Nigerian writer, editor and publisher
Nkem Owoh (born 1958), Nigerian actor and comedian

References

African feminine given names
African masculine given names
Igbo names